Takht may refer to:

Places

Iran
Takht-e Olya, a village in East Azerbaijan Province, Iran
Takht-e Sofla, a village in East Azerbaijan Province, Iran
Takht, Golestan, a village in Mindasht County, Golestan Province, Iran
Takht, Hamadan, a village in Razan County, Hamadan Province, Iran
Takht, Hormozgan, a village in Bandar Abbas County, Hormozgan Province, Iran
Takht-e Goru, a village in Bastak County, Hormozgan Province, Iran
Takht, Kurdistan, a village in Saqqez County, Kurdistan Province, Iran
Takht, North Khorasan, a village in Shrivan County, North Khorasan Province, Iran
Takht District, an administrative subdivision of Hormozgan Province, Iran
Takht Rural District, an administrative subdivision of Hormozgan Province, Iran
Takht-e Qeysar, a village in Khuzestan Province, Iran
Takht-e Tuk, a village in Khuzestan Province, Iran
Takht-e Soleymān, an archaeologically notable remains of an ancient temple and citadel in northwestern Iran

Pakistan
Takht-i-Bahi, an archaeological site in Mardan
Takht-e-Sulaiman – a mountain peak in Pakistan

Other uses 
 Takht (Sikhism), the temporal seat of power or throne of authority in Sikhism
 Takht (music), the representative small musical ensemble or orchestra of Arab music
 Takht., taxonomic author abbreviation used for the Soviet-Armenian botanist Armen Takhtajan when citing a botanical name
 Takht (film), an upcoming Hindi-language period drama film

See also 
 Taht (disambiguation)